The 1998 William & Mary Tribe football team represented the College of William & Mary as member of the Mid-Atlantic Division of the Atlantic 10 Conference (A-10) during the 1998 NCAA Division I-AA football season. Led by Jimmye Laycock in his 19th year as head coach, William & Mary finished the season with an overall record of 7–4 and a mark of 4–4 in A-10 play, tying for second place the Mid-Atlantic Division. They were ranked No. 17 in the final Sports Network poll, but did not receive a bid to the NCAA Division I-AA playoffs.

Schedule

References

William and Mary
William & Mary Tribe football seasons
William and Mary Indians football